Gerald Charles Arthur (25 July 1913 – 9 November 2008) was an Australian cricketer who played three first-class matches as a middle-order batsman and wicket-keeper for Western Australia in 1937. Arthur played one match for the Western Australia Colts side against New South Wales in 1935 as a wicket-keeper. All of his first-class matches came on a tour of the Eastern states of Australia during the 1937–38 season. On debut against Victoria he scored 4 and 27, batting at #4 in both innings. In his second match, also against Victoria, he played as a wicket-keeper, effecting four dismissals – three catches and a stumping – as well as being involved in two run outs. Arthur was replaced by usual keeper Ossie Lovelock for the final tour match, against South Australia at the Adelaide Oval. He made 10 and four batting at eight and nine in each innings respectively.

References

1913 births
2008 deaths
Australian cricketers
People from Yarloop, Western Australia
Western Australia cricketers
Cricketers from Western Australia
People educated at Christian Brothers' College, Perth
Wicket-keepers